Daniel Felipe Muñoz Giraldo (born 21 November 1996) is a Colombian cyclist, who currently rides for UCI ProTeam .

Major results
2019
 1st  Overall Tour of Bihor
1st  Mountains classification
1st Stage 2b
 2nd Overall Sibiu Cycling Tour
1st  Mountains classification
 8th Overall Tour de Hongrie
 9th Overall Adriatica Ionica Race
2020 
 9th Overall Tour de Savoie Mont-Blanc
2021
 5th Overall Tour of Romania
1st Stage 3 
 5th Overall Vuelta al Táchira

References

External links

1996 births
Living people
Colombian male cyclists
Sportspeople from Antioquia Department
21st-century Colombian people